A list of films produced by the Tollywood (Bengali language film industry) based in Kolkata in 2011.

Highest-grossing
 Paglu
 Shotru
 Romeo
 Baishe Srabon
 Royal Bengal Rahashya
 Ranjana Ami Ar Ashbona

January–March

April–June

July–September

October–December

References

2011
Lists of 2011 films by country or language
2011 in Indian cinema